Lipovec is a municipality and village in Blansko District in the South Moravian Region of the Czech Republic. It has about 1,200 inhabitants.

Administrative parts
The village of Marianín is an administrative part of Lipovec.

References

Villages in Blansko District